A bolt is the part of a repeating, breechloading firearm that blocks the rear opening (breech) of the barrel chamber while the propellant burns, and moves back and forward to facilitate loading/unloading of cartridges from the magazine.  The firing pin and extractor are often integral parts of the bolt.  The terms "breechblock" and "bolt" are often used interchangeably or without a clear distinction, though usually, a bolt is a type of breechblock that has a nominally circular cross-section.

In most automatic firearms that use delayed blowback, recoil, or gas operation, the bolt itself is housed within the larger bolt carrier group (BCG), which contains additional parts that receives rearward push from a gas tube (direct impingement) or a piston system.

The slide of a self-loading pistol can be considered a bolt carrier, as it contains the same components and serves the same functions.

Description
In manually operated firearms such as bolt-action, lever-action, and pump-action rifles and shotguns, the bolt is held fixed by its locking lugs during firing, forcing all the expanding gas forward. It is manually unlocked and moved to extract the spent casing and chamber another round.

In a self-loading firearm (semi-automatic or fully-automatic), the bolt cycles back and forward between each shot, propelled back by recoil (recoil operation) or the expanding gas (blowback and gas operation) and forward by a spring.  When it moves back, the extractor pulls the spent casing of the previous shot from the chamber, and once the case is clear out of the chamber, the ejector kicks the case out of the firearm.  When the bolt moves forward, it picks up a new cartridge from the magazine and pushes it into the chamber.

A telescoping bolt is a bolt that wraps around the breech end of the barrel. This bolt design is often used to reduce overall weapon length without sacrificing barrel length or bolt weight.

A turn bolt refers to a firearm component where the whole bolt without using a bolt carrier turns to lock/unlock. This is mostly used to describe manually operated bolt action firearms, but also on some automatic firearms.

The most common locking mechanism on rifles is a rotating bolt, which can be classified as a rigid type of bolt lock. Semi-rigid bolt locks have their locking elements movably mounted on either the bolt, barrel or breech housing and using a bolt carrier. Examples of semi-rigid bolt locks are roller-locked bolts, or ball bearings as on Heym SR 30 or Anschütz 1827 Fortner (both straight-pull rifles).

Closed bolt vs. open bolt 

In a closed bolt firearm, the bolt is in its foremost position upon firing. This is opposed to an open bolt firearm where the bolt is held rearward, and pulling the trigger releases it to slam forward and fire the cartridge.

Gallery

See also
 Breechblock
 Rotating bolt
 Telescoping bolt
 Action (firearms)

References
 Full Auto describes the function of the bolt in detail

Firearm components
bg:Затвор (оръжие)
fr:Culasse (arme)
it:Otturatore (armi)
ru:Затвор (деталь оружия)